The Reverend is a style most often used as a prefix to the names of Christian clergy and ministers.

Reverend may also refer to:

 Reverend (band), American heavy metal band
Reverend (EP), a 1989 EP by the band
 "Reverend" (song), by Kings of Leon, 2017
 Reverend and The Makers, an English indie pop band
 Jon McClure or "The Reverend" (born 1981), lead singer for the band
 Reverend Musical Instruments, an American manufacturer of electric guitars and basses
 The Reverend (film), a 2011 British horror film
 Bob Levy (comedian) or "The Reverend" (born 1962), American comedian and radio personality

See also
 
 
 The Honourable
 Venerable (disambiguation)
 Reverence (disambiguation)
 Revenant (disambiguation)